Kanna Lakshminarayana, (born 13 August 1954) is an Indian Politician, ex President BJP Party for the state of Andhra Pradesh  and ex-Member of the Legislative Assembly for Guntur West constituency and ex-Cabinet Minister for Agriculture & Agriculture Technology Mission in Sri. N.Kiran Kumar Reddy's Cabinet. He joined in Telugu Desam Party on 23rd February 2023 at Mangalagiri TDP's headquarters.

Biography

Early life 

Kanna Lakshmi Narayana was born on 13 August 1954 in Nagaram Palem, Guntur District. He was the youngest child born to Kanna Rangaiah & Kanna Masthanamma.

A successful weightlifter, Kanna Lakshmi Narayana was attracted to politics from a very young age. Hailing from a political family of Guntur, Kanna Lakshmi Narayana has since had a political career of his own, now lasting about 40 years.

Getting on his bicycle during his junior college days, Kanna Lakshmi Narayana, a B. Com. graduate, used to invite all to join NSUI by writing on the walls and this was his way of getting initiated into politics.

Kanna Lakshmi Narayana has also competed in shooting, winning a gold medal.

Politics 

In 2009 Kanna Lakshmi Narayana won the election to the State Assembly for the fifth term from Guntur (West) Assembly constituency; he won from Pedakurapadu, the biggest constituency in Andhra Pradesh, for four straight terms, from 1989 to 2004, including the 1994 Assembly elections when only 26 Congressmen won the election.

Kanna Lakshmi Narayana was ex-President BJP party for the state of Andhra Pradesh & ex- Cabinet Minister for Agriculture & Agriculture Technology mission, Minister for Housing in the cabinet of Hon'ble Chief Minister N. Kiran Kumar Reddy, Minister of Major Industries, Food Processing, Commerce & Export Promotion in the cabinet of Hon'ble Chief Minister K. Rosaiah, having served as Transport Minister in the previous Cabinet of late Hon’ble CM Dr. Y. S. Rajashekhar Reddy.

In 2019, he contested for parliament from Narasaraopet and lost the deposit. He came 4th by receiving 1.08% of all the votes polled.

Policies 

Kanna Lakshmi Narayana has a progressive outlook. From the time he started his ministerial responsibilities in 1991 under N. Janardhan Reddy's cabinet till today, Narayana has worked to implement welfare and developmental programs for the weaker sections and backward classes.

Public services 

Kanna Lakshmi Narayana has worked to establish Junior colleges in Krosur and Thallur in his constituency as well as Primary Health Center buildings.

Safe drinking water 
Kanna Lakshmi Narayana has also worked to resolve the health problems caused by the high rate of fluoride content in drinking water in several villages. He secured Rs 3.50 crores of funds sanctioned for Community Protected Drinking Water Scheme for the surrounding villages of Bellamkonda and thus ensured that residents of 17 villages got protected drinking water. Apart from this he also got sanction for 300 bore wells in several villages and protected drinking water schemes were implemented in many villages.

Infrastructure 
Kanna Lakshmi Narayana has worked towards providing electricity facility to over 150 weaker sections’ colonies belonging to Scheduled Castes and Scheduled Tribes. To resolve the problem of low voltage, new transformers and modernization of existing transformers in the villages was undertaken. Sub stations were provided to each Mandal. To speed up the development a good road network and efficient and effective transport system was essential, so Kanna Lakshmi Narayana sanctioned new roads and undertook the construction of bridges in several villages. 
Some other major programs initiated have been housing schemes for weaker sections under Indiramma Phase I and II. In total 28,680 houses were sanctioned and have been completed till date.

Agriculture 
Kanna Lakshmi Narayana has also introduced development programs for agriculture including providing several thousands of acres with irrigation facilities by getting funds to repair and modernize the canals. 18 big lift irrigation schemes were completed and it has helped in providing irrigation facilities to 40,525 acres.
In addition he worked to provide farmers with an adequate supply of seeds, fertilizers and financial assistance to purchase agricultural pump sets.
Narayana also started a new Agricultural Marketing Yard in Krosur. This provided infrastructure for Go Downs, platforms and administrative building and he got sufficient financial resources sanctioned for this developmental activity.

Political career 

Kanna Lakshmi Narayana won the election to the State Assembly for the fifth term from Guntur (West) Assembly constituency in 2009.
He won from Pedakurapadu, the biggest constituency in Andhra Pradesh, for four straight terms, from 1989 to 2004. He joined the BJP on 27 October 2014 in Delhi in presence of Amit Shah, its national president. In 2023 February he quit BJP citing that he is unsatisfied with the BJP state unit leadership.

 1972-1978 : President, District NSUI, Guntur.
 1979-1985 : Worked as development officer, New India Assurance Company.
 1986-1987 : President, City Youth Congress, Guntur.
 1987-1988 : General Secretary, A.P. Youth Congress
 1988-1990 : President, Guntur District Youth Congress & Labour Cell Chief Vice President INTUC District Organising Secretary, A.P. Sevadal
 1996-1998 : General Secretary, Pradesh Congress Committee, Andhra Pradesh. Under the Stewardship of Late Dr. Mallikarjun, President.
 2000-2003 : General Secretary, Pradesh Congress Committee, Andhra Pradesh. Under the Stewardship of Sri M. Satyanarayana Rao, President
 1995 : Member, State Local Bodies Election Committee APCC
 1995-1997 : Chairman, Public Accounts Committee
 1999 : Member State Election Committee APCC
 2004 : Member State Election Committee APCC
 2009 : Member State Election Committee APCC

AS MEMBER OF LEGISLATIVE ASSEMBLY

 1989-1994 : Elected from Pedakurapadu Assembly Constituency, Guntur District
 1994-1999 : Elected from Pedakurapadu Assembly Constituency, Guntur District and as a WHIP of Congress Legislature Party
 1999-2004 : Elected from Pedakurapadu Assembly Constituency, Guntur District
 2004-2009 : Elected from Pedakurapadu Assembly Constituency, Guntur District
 2009 : Elected from Guntur West Assembly Constituency

AS MINISTER

 1991 - 1994 : Minister of State (Independent Charge) in the Cabinet of Sri. Nedurumalli Janardhana Reddy and Late Sri Kotla Vijaya Bhaskara Reddy
 2004 - 2009 : Cabinet Minister in Late Dr. Y.S. Rajasekhar Reddy's Cabinet
 2009 May : Cabinet Minister for Major Industries, Commerce & Export Promotion and Food Processing in Late Dr. Y.S. Rajasekhar Reddy's Cabinet
 2009 September : Cabinet Minister for Major Industries, Commerce & Export Promotion and Food Processing in Sri. K. Rosaiah's Cabinet
 2010 December : Cabinet Minister for Housing in Sri. N. Kiran Kumar Reddy's Cabinet
 2012 February : Cabinet Minister for Agriculture & agriculture technology mission in Sri. N. Kiran Kumar Reddy's Cabinet
 2018 - 2020 : President BJP Party for the state of Andhra Pradesh

Personal life 

Kanna Lakshminarayana is married to Kanna Vijaya Lakshmi. They have two sons, Kanna Naga Raju who was Ex mayor of Guntur city and Kanna Phaneendra who looks after the family business & also owns a polo team which is rated as one of the top three polo teams in Asia.

References 

Telugu politicians
Bharatiya Janata Party politicians from Andhra Pradesh
Indian National Congress politicians from Andhra Pradesh
Living people
1955 births
Members of the Andhra Pradesh Legislative Assembly
People from Guntur
National Democratic Alliance candidates in the 2019 Indian general election
State Presidents of Bharatiya Janata Party